Rzepecki (feminine: Rzepecka; plural: Rzepeccy) is a Polish surname. Notable people with the surname include:

 Jan Rzepecki (1899–1983), Polish soldier and military historian
 Karol Rzepecki (1865–1931), Polish politician
 Łukasz Rzepecki (born 1992), Polish politician
 Michelle Rzepecki (born 1986), Australian goalball player

See also
 

Polish-language surnames